Brocade is a class of richly decorative shuttle-woven fabrics.

It may also refer to:

 Brocade (horse) (1981–2003), British Thoroughbred racehorse
 Beau Brocade, a fictional masked highway man
 Brocade Communications Systems, a telecommunications company

See also

 Dusky Brocade